Alan Anatolyevich Murtazov (born 26 September 1984) is a former Russian professional football player.

Club career
He played in the Russian Football National League for FC Zhemchuzhina-Sochi in 2010.

External links
 
 

1984 births
Living people
Russian footballers
Association football midfielders
FC Spartak Vladikavkaz players
FC Zhemchuzhina Sochi players
FC Tyumen players
Sportspeople from Vladikavkaz